The Type 079 landing ship (NATO reporting name: Yulian-class) was a class of landing ship medium (LSM) of the People's Liberation Army Navy. There are two subclasses of this type; 079I and 079II.

Background
The origin of the Type 79 series LSM dates back in the 1970s, when North Vietnam asked China to produce a landing ship capable of carrying around 200 tons of cargo with maximum speed of 12 kn, but more importantly, the manufacturing technique had to be simply so that it must be able to be built quickly in large numbers.

Type 079I
Design work by the 708th Research Institute for the Type 079 took more than two years, lasting from 1971 to 1973, and construction began in May 1974 at Guangzhou Shipyard International, and the first ship was launched on July 22, 1976. Due to changes in Sino-Vietnamese relations, the end customer became the PLAN instead of the Vietnam People's Navy. The ship entered PLAN service in October, 1976. This class received NATO reporting name Yulian-class. Trials between December 1972 to January 1977 revealed the performance was somewhat satisfactory, but the speed was slow and the ability to operate in bad weather condition was poor, with the maximum sea state allowed to operate being sea state 6. Work immediately began on a redesign named as Type 079II, while the first unit was subsequently named as Type 079I.

Type 79II
Shortcomings of the Type 79I LSM revealed in trials lead to immediate redesign named as Type 79II LSM, which was completed in October 1977. A total of 31 were built, including the conversion of the sole Type 079I to Type 079II standard. 26 were completed by Guangzhou Shipyard International, and 4 were completed by Xiamen Shipyard. Like its predecessor Type 079I, the Type 079II was also designed by 708th Research Institute. The main difference between 079I and 079II is that the latter is larger, with dimensions increased to 72 m x 13.8 m x 2.6 m respectively, and the displacement was increased to 833 tonnes. More complex machinery was added, which lead to the increase of crew members to 109, more than 3 times of that of the original Type 079I. The speed was also slightly increased to 13 kn. Armament was strengthened by the addition of two BM21 122 mm rocket launchers. Nearly three decades after production ended in 1983, most still remained in Chinese service, mostly in Chinese navy South Sea Fleet (PLAN SSF), though most of them were delegated to transport duties.

Ships of the class
All have been decommissioned.

See also
People's Liberation Army Navy Surface Force

References

External links
PLAN landing ship classes - current and historic (haijun360.com)

Amphibious warfare vessel classes
Amphibious warfare vessels of the People's Liberation Army Navy